Joseph Jefferson (1829–1905) was an American stage actor.

Joseph Jefferson may also refer to:
Joseph Jefferson (American football) (born 1980), American football cornerback
Joseph H. Jefferson (born 1947), American politician
Joseph Jefferson (priest) (died 1821), Archdeacon of Colchester
Joseph John Jefferson (1795–1882), British Congregationalist minister and advocate for Christian pacifism